Najaf-Qoli Khan Bakhtiari  also known Saad al-Dowleh and Samsam al-Saltane (1846–1930), was an Iranian Prime Minister and a leader of the Iranian Constitutional Revolution. He was elected Prime Minister for two terms, first from 3 May 1909 to 16 July 1909 and again from 23 December 1912 to 17 January 1913, when he resigned from the office. He was a representative of Parliament of Iran from Tehran in the 4th Parliament. He was the older brother of Ali-Qoli Khan Bakhtiari. He died in 1930 in Isfahan.

Party affiliation 
He is reported to be a member of the Moderate Socialists Party but he was favoured by the Democrat Party at the time appointed as the Prime Minister and formed a pro-Democrat cabinet.

References

1846 births
1930 deaths
People from Chaharmahal and Bakhtiari Province
Prime Ministers of Iran
Deputies of Tehran for National Consultative Assembly
People of the Persian Constitutional Revolution
19th-century Iranian politicians
20th-century Iranian politicians
Bakhtiari people
Moderate Socialists Party politicians
Burials at Takht-e Foulad